Casey Walls (born January 10, 2003) is an American professional soccer player who plays as a defender for Major League Soccer club San Jose Earthquakes.

Club career

Youth
Born in Surrey, England, Walls started his career in the Chelsea academy, before moving to the United States. He joined the San Jose Earthquakes in 2017 from local side Marin FC. He grew up in Mill Valley, California.

Walls joined the San Jose Earthquakes Academy in 2017, joining from Marin FC. He went on to compete for the Quakes at the U-15, U-17 and U-19 levels.

San Jose Earthquakes
San Jose signed Walls to a homegrown player contract on November 5, 2019, ahead of the 2020 MLS season.

On May 3, 2021, Walls joined USL Championship side Austin Bold on a season-long loan. He made his professional debut on July 24, 2021, appearing as a 74th-minute substitute during a 1–1 draw with Rio Grande Valley FC.

International career
Walls has played within the United States Youth National Team system, spending time with the U-14, U-15 and U-16 sides.

References

External links

MLS profile

2003 births
Living people
American soccer players
Homegrown Players (MLS)
San Jose Earthquakes players
Austin Bold FC players
Association football defenders
Soccer players from California
People from Mill Valley, California
USL Championship players
American people of English descent
United States men's youth international soccer players
United States men's under-20 international soccer players
MLS Next Pro players